Neerav (originally Sanskrit) means "quiet or calm."

The name Neerav is derived from Sanskrit. In Hindu origin the meaning of name Neerav is: Silent. This name commonly used by Hindus. It is widely used in Bengali, Gujarati, Punjabi, Sanskrit, and Malayalam. The name is used not only in India but also in Nepal.

People
 Neerav Bavlecha, Indian professional dancer and choreographer. He judged popular Malayalam dance reality series titled D 4 Dance
 Nirav Shah, Indian cinematographer
 Nirav D. Shah, American epidemiologist, economist and attorney, known for being Maine CDC director during COVID-19 pandemic

References

Hindu given names
Bengali names
Gujarati given names
Punjabi names